The Union for Rebirth / Sankarist Party (UNIR / PS) is a political party in Burkina Faso.

History

The party was founded on November 1, 2000. Its president is Bénéwendé Stanislas Sankara.

The name "Sankarist" party appears to be a reference to both the late President Thomas Sankara and the party's current leader. The party subscribes to Sankarism.

At the legislative elections on 5 May 2002, the party won 2.4% of the popular vote and three out of 111 seats. In the presidential election of 13 November 2005, its candidate Bénéwendé Stanislas Sankara took second place with 4.88% of the popular vote. At the 2007 parliamentary elections, the party won 4 seats.

National Assembly

See also 

 Union of Sankarist Parties
 :Category:Union for Rebirth / Sankarist Party politicians

References

2010 establishments in Burkina Faso
Political parties established in 2010
Political parties in Burkina Faso
Sankarist political parties in Burkina Faso